The 1958 Princeton Tigers football team was an American football team that represented Princeton University as a member of the Ivy League during the 1958 NCAA University Division football season. 

In their second year under head coach Dick Colman, the Tigers compiled a 6–3 record and outscored opponents 217 to 164. Frederick W. Tiley was the team captain.

Princeton's 5–2 conference record tied for second place in the Ivy League. The Tigers outscored Ivy opponents 177 to 123.

Princeton played its home games at Palmer Stadium on the university campus in Princeton, New Jersey.

Schedule

References

Princeton
Princeton Tigers football seasons
Princeton Tigers football